Russell Sage Wildlife Management Area, also referred to as Russell Sage WMA, became the first WMA owned by the Louisiana Department of Wildlife and Fisheries upon purchasing 15,000 acres of property in 1960. The WMA is located about seven miles east of Monroe and 10 miles west of Rayville. The 2,767-acre Kennedy Tract was purchased in 2015. There are 2,955 acres owned by the U.S. Army Corps of Engineers, 1,240 acres owned by the Ouachita Parish School Board, and 13,332 acre Ouachita WMA that was consolidated in 2015.

See also
List of Louisiana Wildlife Management Areas

References

Wildlife management areas of the United States
Wildlife management areas of Louisiana
Protected areas of Louisiana
Geography of Allen Parish, Louisiana